Danila Alekseyevich Khakhalev (born 23 January 1997) is a Russian football player.

Club career
He made his debut for the main squad of FC Rostov on 24 September 2015 in a Russian Cup game against FC Tosno.

He made his debut in the Russian Professional Football League for FC Rotor Volgograd on 21 May 2017 in a game against FC Legion-Dynamo Makhachkala.

References

External links
 Profile by Russian Professional Football League

1997 births
Sportspeople from Volgograd
Living people
Russian footballers
FC Rostov players
FC Rotor Volgograd players
Association football forwards
Association football midfielders